Marc Marc is a city in the Castries Quarter of St. Lucia in the Lesser Antilles. It is located at an elevation of 528 feet.

Airports nearest to Marc Marc from the city centre: 
 Vigie Airport, Saint Lucia (distanced approximately 8.3 km)
 Hewanorra Airport, Saint Lucia (distanced approximately 24 km)
 Lamentin Airport,  Martinique (distanced approximately 71 km)
 Arnos Vale Airport, Saint Vincent (distanced approximately 93 km)
 J. F. Mitchell Airport, Bequia (distanced approximately 110 km)

References

Towns in Saint Lucia